The 2019 Réunion Premier League is the 70th season of the Réunion Premier League, the professional league for association football clubs in Réunion, since the league's establishment in 1950. The season started on 17 March 2019.

Standings
Final table.

  1.JS Saint-Pierroise              26  18  6  2  48-17  86                         Champions
  2.US Sainte-Marienne              26  17  5  4  46-24  82
  3.Saint-Denis FC                  26  14  7  5  43-24  75
  4.AS Excelsior (Saint-Joseph)     26  15  3  8  42-27  74
  5.La Tamponnaise                  26  10 12  4  42-26  68
  6.SS Jeanne d'Arc (Le Port)       26  11  7  8  43-30  66
  7.Trois Bassins FC                26  10  6 10  35-42  62
  8.SS Capricorne (Saint-Pierre)    26   8  9  9  26-31  59
  9.Saint-Pauloise FC               26   7  5 14  22-41  52
 10.SDEFA                           26   7  4 15  23-46  51  [2 1 0 1 4-3 5]
 11.AF Saint-Louis                  26   6  7 13  26-42  51  [2 1 0 1 3-4 5]
  - - - - - - - - - - - - - - - - - - - - - - - - - - - - -
 12.AS Marsouins (Saint-Leu)        26   5  6 15  25-38  46  [-1]                   Relegation Playoff
 ----------------------------------------------------------
 13.AS Saint-Louisienne             26   5  4 17  31-51  45  [2 1 0 1 2-2 5; 1 ag]  Relegated
 14.AS MJC Sainte-Suzanne           26   2 13 11  21-34  45  [2 1 0 1 2-2 5; 0 ag]  Relegated

Top scorers

References

Football competitions in Réunion
Premier League
Reunion